Ukrainian airline Aerosvit served seventy-two destinations in Asia, Europe and North America from its base at Kyiv Boryspil Airport as well as operating domestic flights. In addition to scheduled destinations listed below, Aerosvit operated charter flights to a variety of destinations:

Following bankruptcy proceedings, the airline announced that it would operate only domestically, plus five long-haul (New York, Beijing, Ho Chi Minh city, Bangkok, Goa) and four medium-haul (Moscow, St. Petersburg, Istanbul and Tashkent) routes, with most CIS connections, and all European routes outside Russia and Ukraine, discontinued. The airline ceased operations in February 2013.

Asia
 Armenia
Yerevan – Zvartnots International Airport
 Azerbaijan
Baku – Heydar Aliyev International Airport
Ganja – Ganja International Airport
 People's Republic of China
Beijing – Beijing Capital International Airport
 Cyprus
Larnaca – Larnaca International Airport
 Georgia
Tbilisi – Tbilisi International Airport
Batumi – Batumi International Airport
 India
Delhi – Indira Gandhi International Airport
Goa – Dabolim Airport
 Israel
Tel Aviv – Ben Gurion International Airport
 Thailand
Bangkok – Suvarnabhumi Airport
 United Arab Emirates
Dubai – Dubai International Airport
 Uzbekistan
Tashkent – Tashkent International Airport
 Viet Nam
Ho Chi Minh City – Tan Son Nhat International Airport

Europe
 Belarus
Minsk – Minsk International Airport
 Bulgaria
Sofia – Sofia Airport
 Czech Republic
Prague – Václav Havel Airport Prague
 Denmark
Copenhagen – Kastrup Airport
 Germany
Berlin Tegel Airport 
Hamburg – Hamburg Airport
Düsseldorf – Düsseldorf Airport
Stuttgart – Stuttgart Airport
 Greece
Athens – Athens International Airport
Thessaloniki – Thessaloniki International Airport
 Hungary
Budapest – Budapest Ferenc Liszt International Airport
 Italy
Milan – Malpensa International Airport
Naples – Naples Airport
 Lithuania
Vilnius – Vilnius International Airport
 Republic of Moldova
Chişinău – Chişinău International Airport 
 Poland
Kraków – John Paul II International Airport Kraków-Balice
Warsaw – Warsaw Chopin Airport
 Romania
Bucharest – Henri Coandă International Airport
 Russia
Kaliningrad – Khrabrovo Airport
Krasnodar – Pashkovsky Airport
Moscow – Sheremetyevo International Airport
Murmansk – Murmansk Airport
Nizhnevartovsk – Nizhnevartovsk Airport
Novosibirsk – Tolmachevo Airport
Rostov-on-Don – Rostov-on-Don Airport
Saint Petersburg – Pulkovo Airport
Sochi – Sochi International Airport
Yekaterinburg – Koltsovo Airport
 Sweden
Stockholm – Stockholm-Arlanda Airport
 Turkey
Istanbul – Atatürk International Airport
 Ukraine
Dnipro – Dnipro International Airport
Donetsk – Donetsk International Airport
Ivano-Frankivsk – Ivano-Frankivsk International Airport
Kharkiv – Kharkiv International Airport
Kyiv – Boryspil International Airport hub
Lviv – Danylo Halytskyi International Airport
Odesa – Odesa International Airport
Sevastopol – Sevastopol International Airport 
Simferopol – Simferopol International Airport
 United Kingdom
London – Gatwick Airport

North America
 Canada
Toronto – Pearson International Airport
 United States
New York City – John F. Kennedy International Airport

References

Lists of airline destinations